Holcomb Township is a township in Dunklin County, in the U.S. state of Missouri.

Holcomb Township was originally called Holcomb Island Township, and under the latter name was organized in 1845.

References

Townships in Missouri
Townships in Dunklin County, Missouri